Harun-ar-Rashid is a Bangladeshi politician and the former Member of Parliament of Comilla-3.

Personal life and family
Rashid was born into a Bengali Muslim family in the village of Bhubanghar in Muradnagar, Tippera District. He married Noor Jahan, and they had a son named Yussuf Abdullah Harun on 15 November 1947, who is also a politician.

Career
Rashid participated in the 1979 Bangladeshi general election as a Bangladesh Nationalist Party candidate for the Comilla-3 constituency.

References

Bangladesh Nationalist Party politicians
Living people
2nd Jatiya Sangsad members
Year of birth missing (living people)
20th-century Bengalis